SB-258585 is a drug which is used in scientific research. It acts as a potent, selective and orally active 5-HT6 receptor antagonist, with a Ki of 8.9nM. It is used in its 125I radiolabelled form to map the distribution of 5-HT6 receptors in the brain.

SB-258585 and other 5-HT6 antagonists show nootropic effects in animal studies, as well as antidepressant and anxiolytic effects, and have been proposed as potential novel treatments for cognitive disorders such as schizophrenia and Alzheimer's disease.

References 

5-HT6 antagonists
N-(2-methoxyphenyl)piperazines
Sulfonamides
Iodoarenes